The Chicago, Milwaukee, St. Paul and Pacific Railroad Depot in Albert Lea, Minnesota, United States, is a historic railway station.  It was added to the National Register of Historic Places in 1982.  The railroad line through Albert Lea was originally built by the Southern Minnesota Railroad circa 1868. The depot was built in 1914 and housed waiting, office and freight areas. An express office was added around 1930.

References

Railway stations on the National Register of Historic Places in Minnesota
Albert Lea, Minnesota
Railway stations in the United States opened in 1914
Former railway stations in Minnesota
National Register of Historic Places in Freeborn County, Minnesota